Danzell is a given name. Notable people with the given name include:

Danzell Gravenberch (born 1994), Dutch footballer
Danzell Lee (born 1963), American football player